The Congressional Soccer Match (CSM) is an annual event held in Washington, D.C.  that features Members of Congress, Hill staffers, corporations, and community members to participate in a soccer tournament.

The event consists of an Embassy tournament, the Congressional Soccer Match, and a staffer tournament.

The event is hosted by the United States Soccer Foundation. As one of the Foundation’s annual charity events, all proceeds from the Match go toward the U.S. Soccer Foundation’s proven programs.

As of 2022, the defending champions are the Democrats.

Results

See also 
 Congressional Baseball Game
 Soccer in the United States

References

External links 
 Congressional Soccer Match

Soccer competitions in the United States
Sports competitions in Washington, D.C.
Recurring sporting events established in 2013
Legislative branch of the United States government
2013 establishments in Washington, D.C.
Politics and sports